The 2021 Tournoi de France was scheduled to be the second edition of the Tournoi de France, an international women's football tournament held annually in France and organized by the French Football Federation.

While the organization of the tournament seemed uncertain due to the COVID-19 pandemic, the FFF announced that the tournament would happen on 26 January 2021, unlike England which canceled the tournament it was planning on hosting. The matches were scheduled to be played behind closed doors. On 9 and 10 February 2021, Norway and Iceland announced their withdrawal from the competition, due to the COVID-19 pandemic in Europe.

On 11 February, the FFF announced that they have decided to cancel the tournament and France would play two friendly matches against Switzerland on 20 and 23 February.

Teams

Venues

References

2021 in women's association football
2020–21 in French football
2020–21 in Swiss football
Tournoi de France (Women)
February 2021 sports events in France